Michael Steven Knight AO (born 21 September 1952 in , New South Wales) is a former Australian Labor Party  politician. He was member for Campbelltown in the New South Wales Legislative Assembly between 1981 and 2001. He served as Minister for the Olympics between 1995 and 2001 in the Carr Labor government.

Background and early career 
Knight attended Doonside High School and Cranbrook School. He graduated with a Bachelor of Arts (Honours) from the University of Sydney and worked for the Campbelltown City Council as a social planner and parole officer before entering politics.

Political career 
Knight entered the New South Wales Legislative Assembly at the 1981 election succeeding Cliff Mallam who had held the seat for ten years. Originally a member of the leftwing faction, Knight defected to rightwing faction after a trip in Europe which convinced him that socialism had failed.

Knight remained on the back bench until 1995 when he was appointed to the state Cabinet with ministerial responsibilities for Public Works and Services, the Olympics and Roads. His responsibilities were later in 1995 reduced to Roads and Olympics. In 1996 this was further reduced to responsibility for the Olympics, a portfolio he held until his retirement in 2001. As Minister for the Olympics he was Chair of the Sydney Organising Committee for the Olympic Games (SOCOG).

Post political career 
In 2007 Knight was appointed to the Chair of the Board of the Sydney Olympic Park Authority, the body which manages the day-to-day running and future development of Sydney Olympic Park. He was reappointed to the Board as its Chairman in 2013, and his term expired in June 2016.

Knight was a director of the state–owned corporation, Delta Electricity, until December 2010 when he was one of the four directors who resigned en masse in protest of the privatisation of the generating assets of the company. During 2005 he also served as chairman of Sydney Gas Limited, prior to its takeover by the Australian Gas Light Company.

He is also the non-executive chairman of InfraShore, a public-private partnership consortium between Thiess and Royal Bank of Scotland in charge of the billion-dollar redevelopment of Royal North Shore Hospital.

Honours
In January 2002 Knight was appointed an Officer of the Order of Australia for services to: Olympic and Paralympic sport, particularly in the area of Games' administration; to the New South Wales Parliament; and, to the community of Campbelltown.

In 2000, Knight was awarded a Gold Olympic Order by the IOC at the closing ceremony of the Sydney 2000 Olympic Games.

Personal
Knight is married to Anne, and they have two daughters. He is a keen supporter of Wests Tigers rugby league team.

References

External links

1952 births
Living people
Presidents of the Organising Committees for the Olympic Games
Australian people of German descent
Members of the New South Wales Legislative Assembly
Officers of the Order of Australia
University of Sydney alumni
People educated at Cranbrook School, Sydney
Australian Labor Party members of the Parliament of New South Wales
Recipients of the Olympic Order
21st-century Australian politicians